The committees of the 14th Supreme People's Assembly (SPA) of North Korea were elected by the 1st Session of the aforementioned body on 11 April 2019.

Committees

Budget

Legislation

Deputy Credentials
Not made public.

Foreign Affairs

References

Citations

Bibliography
Books:
 

13th Supreme People's Assembly
2014 establishments in North Korea
2019 disestablishments in North Korea